Tamargo is a surname. Notable people with the surname include:

Domingo Tamargo (1883-1947), Cuban minister and Supreme Court justice
Eva Tamargo (born 1960), American actress
John Tamargo (born 1951), American baseball player
José Luis Luege Tamargo (born 1953), Mexican politician
Margarita Tamargo-Sanchez (1915–2005), Cuban-born American pharmacist and bacteriologist
Maria C. Tamargo (born 1951), Cuban-American scientist
Mauricio J. Tamargo (born 1957), Cuban-born American government official